Rainer Blasczyk (born January 8, 1962 in Castrop-Rauxel) is a German physician for transfusion medicine specialized in histocompatibility and immunogenetics in the field of organ transplantation. He is known for the development of genetic engineering of allografts to prevent organ rejection.

Career 
Blasczyk holds a professorship in the subject at Hannover Medical School and the directorship of the institute of transfusion medicine and transplant engineering since 1998. He graduated in Medicine at the University of Essen in 1987 and began his clinical education as a junior clinician in abdominal surgery at the University of Marburg, where his interest in organ transplantation evolved. In 1988, he moved to the institute of immunology at the University of Essen, where he started to work in the field of histocompatibility and immunogenetics. From 1991 to 1993 he continued his clinical education in hematology and oncology at the University of Duesseldorf. Following these clinical years he returned to the field of immunology in 1993 at the institute of transfusion medicine, Humboldt-University of Berlin, where he started to work on molecular immunogenetics.

Blasczyk was president of the German Society for Immunogenetics (DGI) from 2006-2008 and 2012-2014, president of the German Society of Transfusion Medicine and Immunohematology (DGTI) from 2015-2016, served as a board member of the European Federation for Immunogenetics (EFI) from 2008-2010 and as transplantation specialist on its advisory board from 2009-2019. Blasczyk is editor of the journal Transfusion Medicine and member of the editorial board of the journal HLA. From 2016-2019, he has been an appointed member of the Advisory Board on Blood Products of the German Federal Ministry of Health.

Work 
The scientific work of Blasczyk is focused on the alloimmune response in transplantation and strategies to combat organ rejection. Together with Constanca Figueiredo, he initiated the research on transplant engineering by genetically modifying allografts during their inevitable ex vivo period after explantation in such a way that they become permanently invisible to the recipient's immune system and are prevented from rejection. Since 2018, Blasczyk has been head of the research consortium on invisible organs, an innovation network funded jointly by the European Regional Development Fund and the state of Lower Saxony, Germany.

References 

Living people
German immunologists
People from Castrop-Rauxel
Physicians from Hanover
1962 births